The 2013 NC State Wolfpack baseball team represented North Carolina State University in the 2013 NCAA Division I baseball season.  The Wolfpack was coached by Elliott Avent, in his seventeenth season, and played their home games at Doak Field.

The Wolfpack finished with 50 wins, the most in school history, against 16 losses overall, and 19–10 in the Atlantic Coast Conference, good for second place in the Atlantic Division.  They reached the College World Series for just the second time in their history, where they finished 1–2, eliminated by rival North Carolina 7–0.

Roster

Coaches

Schedule

Ranking Movements

Notes

References

NC State Wolfpack baseball seasons
NC State
College World Series seasons
2013 NCAA Division I baseball tournament participants
NC State Wolf